J. J. Milan (born August 11, 1984 in Reno, Nevada) is a former American football defensive end. He was signed by the Oakland Raiders as an undrafted free agent in 2007. He played college football at Nevada.

Milan has also been a member of the Indianapolis Colts and Chicago Bears.

Early years
Milan played high school football for Earl Wooster High School in Reno.

Professional career

Oakland Raiders
He signed with the Oakland Raiders of the National Football League in 2007 but was waived on August 3, 2007.

Indianapolis Colts
On August 7, 2007, Milan was claimed off waivers by the Indianapolis Colts. He failed to report to the team and was placed on the reserve/did not report list two days later, where he would spend the entire 2007 season. He was reinstated to the team's active roster on April 14, 2008. On June 6, 2008, Milan was waived/injured by the team, cleared waivers, and was placed on injured reserve on June 11, 2008.

Chicago Bears
Milan signed with the Chicago Bears on August 11, 2009. He was waived on August 31.

References

1984 births
Living people
Sportspeople from Reno, Nevada
Players of American football from Nevada
American football linebackers
American football defensive ends
Nevada Wolf Pack football players
Oakland Raiders players
Indianapolis Colts players
Chicago Bears players